WesBanco, Inc., is a bank holding company headquartered in Wheeling, West Virginia. It has over 200 branches in West Virginia, Ohio, Western Pennsylvania, Kentucky, Maryland, and Southern Indiana.

WesBanco is the second-largest bank headquartered in West Virginia, after United Bank. Based on total deposits, it is the third-largest bank operating in West Virginia, after BB&T and United Bank.

In addition to banking services, the company offers insurance and investment products.

The company owns the naming rights to the WesBanco Arena, home of the Wheeling Nailers hockey team.

History
The company was initially chartered on January 20, 1870, as "The German Bank". In 1968, WesBanco, Inc. was incorporated.

In July 1992, the company acquired First National Bank of Barnesville, Ohio.

In 2004, the company acquired Western Ohio Financial Corporation, the parent company of Cornerstone Bank, for $65.2 million.

In 2007, the company acquired Oak Hill Financial for $201 million in cash and stock.

During the financial crisis of 2007-2008, the company received a $75 million investment by the United States Department of the Treasury as part of the Troubled Asset Relief Program. The company repurchased most of the investment in September 2009.

In March 2009, the company acquired branches in Columbus, Ohio, from AmTrust Bank, which was being liquidated.

In November 2012, the company acquired Fidelity Bancorp, expanding into the Pittsburgh area.

In February 2015, the company further expanded its Pittsburgh-area presence with the acquisition of Ellwood City, Pennsylvania-based ESB Financial Corporation.

In September 2016, the company expanded into Kentucky and Southern Indiana with the acquisition of Your Community Bankshares.

On April 5, 2018, the company acquired First Sentry Bancshares, Inc. (of Huntington, West Virginia).

On November 14, 2019, the company announced the impending merger with Maryland-based Old Line Bank with WesBanco being the surviving entity.

References

External links

American companies established in 1968
Banks established in 1968
Banks based in West Virginia
Companies listed on the Nasdaq